Iserbrook railway station in Hamburg, Germany, is located on the extended Altona-Blankenese line and is served by the trains of the Hamburg S-Bahn.

The rapid transit trains of the line S1 of the Hamburg S-Bahn call the station on the border of the quarters Iserbrook (north of the track) and Sülldorf (south of the track) of the Altona borough in Hamburg.

History
The steam railway line to Wedel itself had been established in 1883, but there was no need for a station in Iserbrook at that time, as settlement in the area started not before the 1910s and 20s. After the Second World War, many refugees from Hamburg city lived in Nissen huts in the quarter and first major apartment buildings were built, so there was an increased demand for a train stop. The station opened on 31 October 1950, few months after the electrification of the railway line was extended to Sülldorf, later to Wedel. On 18 May 1978 a new station opened south of the old one, which was demolished afterwards.

Station layout
The station is an elevated station with a platform and 1 track. It is the only S-Bahn station in Hamburg with one track. There is no service personnel attending the station, but an SOS and information telephone is available. There are 90 places to lock a bicycle, as well as a few parking spots. The station is not fully accessible for handicapped persons, because there is no lift, but there is a ramp, which can be used by handicapped persons with help. There are no lockerboxes.

Services
The trains in direction Blankenese and Wedel use the single track in both directions. A bus stop in front of the railway station is called by bus line 285.

See also

Hamburger Verkehrsverbund (HVV) (Public transport association in Hamburg)

References

External links
DB station information 

Hamburg S-Bahn stations in Hamburg
Buildings and structures in Altona, Hamburg
Railway stations in Germany opened in 1950